A United States Senate page (Senate page or simply page) is a high-school age teen serving the United States Senate in Washington, D.C. Pages are nominated by senators, usually from their home state, and perform a variety of tasks, such as delivering messages and legislative documents on the Senate floor and the various Capitol Hill offices. Pages are provided housing and attend a special page school at the Daniel Webster Senate Page Residence. Senate pages were first appointed in 1829. Originally limited to boys only, the Senate page program was expanded in 1971 to include girls. There are 30 pages at each Senate session, with 16 appointed by the majority party and 14 by the minority. Pages are assigned to serve senators of the sponsoring senator's party.

History
The Senate Page Program dates back to 1829 when the first page was appointed by Daniel Webster. In addition to the delivery of legislative correspondence, early pages were responsible for refilling ink wells, constructing fires, cleaning spittoons, and fetching chewing tobacco. In 1971,  Paulette Desell, Ellen McConnell, and Julie Price became the Senate’s first female pages.
Until 1995, the education of Senate pages was provided by the District of Columbia public schools at a school located in the Library of Congress.

Selection
In order to become a U.S. Senate page, one must first be nominated by a senator, generally from his or her state.  A candidate must be a sixteen- or seventeen-year-old high school sophomore (10th grade) or rising junior (11th grade), with at least a 3.0 GPA.  Processes for selection vary by state and senator.  Typically, a senator's office will require the applicant to submit a transcript, résumé, and various essays.  The process is similar to that of selecting an office employee, and may include interview of final applicants by a board of review. The application process for the program is considered to be extremely competitive, with a high level of interest for a handful of openings.

Students can apply for appointment to one of four terms: a Fall semester (September – January), a Spring semester (January – June), a three- or four-week June session, and a three- or four-week July session. If a vacancy opens during the course of the term, the position can not be filled until the beginning of the next session.

For each session, there are 30 pages. The majority appoints 16, while the minority appoints 14.

Uniform and appearance
Because U.S. Senate pages are required to wear uniforms while on the job, they are some of the most recognizable employees of the United States Congress.  The uniform consists of a navy blue suit, a white, long sleeve, traditional dress shirt, a name badge, page insignia lapel pin, and a plain, navy tie (males only). Pages are not allowed to add any decoration to their uniform, and at all times must maintain a conservative appearance. Until the 1960s, boys were required to wear knickerbockers as part of their uniform while on duty, as depicted in the 1941 film about the role of Senate pages, Adventure in Washington.

As expected of most Senate employees, pages are required to maintain a neat, professional appearance.  Boys must be clean-shaven with hair kept short and neat, falling above their ears.  Girls must also have their hair neat and kept out of their face.  No extraneous jewelry is to be worn. Pages may not wear unnatural nail polish colors or excessive makeup.

Residence

U.S. Senate pages reside at the Daniel Webster Senate Page Residence. This facility is a former funeral home and was reconfigured in order to provide pages with a home away from home during their time in Washington. Administration and staff include the Page Program director, administrative assistant, four resident proctors, and one non-resident proctor.

Pages are held to extremely high academic and moral standards. They are subject to strict curfews, are prohibited from having personal cell phones or internet access at Webster Hall (with the exception of Senate computers used for school work), and maintain demanding schedules. Pages may be issued demerits, be required to have an earlier curfew, or be restricted to their dorm at certain hours for rule violations. Although pages are allowed to have personal electronic devices (excluding mobile phones), they may not take photographs or videos, given the confidential nature of their jobs. They are also strictly forbidden from speaking to members of the news media without the permission of the program director.

The pages are provided living quarters at Webster Hall on two floors, one for boys and the other for girls, with a day room on each floor for social activity.  All pages share furnished rooms with other pages, with four or six occupants.

School

U.S. Senate pages (who serve during either of the semester programs) attend school located in the lower level of Webster Hall. The U.S. Senate Page School is accredited by the Middle States Association of Colleges and Secondary Schools. The Page School requires each student to enroll in four classes, in the various subjects of mathematics, science, English, and social studies. Foreign language tutoring is available. Usually the students receive 5 to 6 hours of homework each night. If they do not maintain at least a C in each class, they are subject to dismissal.

Classes begin weekdays at 6:15 a.m., with class length depending on the Senate schedule. Generally, school ends one hour and 15 minutes before the Senate convenes. If the Senate does not convene, or convenes at 11:00 a.m. or later, school ends at 9:45 a.m.  It is possible to have classes as short as 20 minutes, or no classes at all.  This is affected by what time the Senate convenes as well as what time it adjourned the previous day. If the Senate is in recess, classes may run as late as noon.

Pages must be in uniform for classes, and may not enter the Page School otherwise (except on weekends to access the library). The Page School supervises Student Government and the preparation of a yearbook.  It also administers page class rings, which have the Senate emblem and session of the Congress in place of a typical high school's mascot.

Pages are also required to participate in school field trips. Run by the Senate Page School, they are conducted approximately one Saturday a month to sites in or around Washington. These field trips are usually at historically oriented landmarks in the mid-Atlantic area (i.e. Liberty Bell, Philadelphia; DuPont Mills, Delaware; etc.)

Sonceria Berry, the Secretary of the Senate, is responsible for the United States Senate Page School.

Prior to the page residence being moved to Webster Hall in 1995, the U.S. Senate Page School was housed in the attic of the Library of Congress.

Summer pages

During the summer sessions only, pages may live at home or in the homes of their relatives in the Washington, D.C., area.  Commuter summer pages fulfill the same duties as the residential summer pages, except that they arrive at 9:00 a.m. and depart at 6:00 p.m. regardless of the action of the Senate that day (residential pages are required to stay until after the Senate adjourns for the day). Commuter pages are allowed to participate in field trips with the other pages. Summer pages do not attend the Senate Page School.

Benefits
The job of page comes with many perks: working in the Senate Chamber and witnessing political action and legislative debates; access to most areas of the Capitol (such as the Senate Chamber, Marble Room, cloakrooms, and Senate lobby), a perk that most other Senate employees do not have; boarding on Capitol Hill with teenagers from all around the country; a chance to watch joint sessions of Congress, as well as the State of the Union Address; the opportunity to make use of the Library of Congress, United States Senate Library, and other facilities in the Capitol; a chance to tour and see much of what Washington, D.C. as well as surrounding areas and states have to offer; opportunities to meet visiting Heads of State and celebrities visiting the Capitol; daily interaction with senators and staff in a professional environment; the opportunity to meet Cabinet members and other elected officials.

Program scrutiny
The U.S. Senate Page Program has undergone massive scrutiny throughout the years, as recounted in The Children Who Ran for Congress: A History of Congressional Pages by Darryl Gonzalez. The House Page Program was shut down in 2011, following multiple sex scandals involving pages and members of Congress. While the Senate Page Program remained intact (although it underwent major adjustments), it is sometimes criticized as being overly patronage-based, too demanding on minors, and too isolating for its participants. Pages are not allowed to have personal cell phones during their tenure and are forbidden from accessing the internet at Webster Hall, except for educational purposes. Pages often get less than six hours of sleep a night and must maintain above an 80 percent average in rigorous courses, in addition to working sometimes over 60 hours a week at the Senate. Pages do, however, have free access to healthcare and counseling during their stay in D.C.

Notable former Senate pages
 Spiro Agnew (later Vice President)
 Bobby Baker – senior staffer to Lyndon B. Johnson
 Michael Bennet (later a Senator, D-CO)
 Dan Boren – summer 1989 (later U.S. congressman)
 Amy Carter – daughter of President Jimmy Carter
 Morgan Lyon Cotti Associate Director of the Hinckley Institute of Politics
 Thomas M. Davis – 1963-1967 (later U.S. Congressman)
 Christopher Dodd (later a Senator, D-CT)
 Laura C. Dove – Former US Senate Secretary for the Majority 
 Arthur Pue Gorman – US Senator
 Neil Gorsuch – Associate Justice of the Supreme Court
 Josh Gottheimer (later a member of the U.S. House of Representatives, D-NJ)
 Jim Kolbe (later a member of the U.S. House of Representatives, R-AZ)
 Mike Lee (later a Senator, R-UT)
 Robby Mook (campaign manager of the Hillary Clinton 2016 presidential campaign)
 Hannah Pingree – 1992 (later Speaker, Maine House of Representatives, 2008–2010; State Representative 2002–2011)
 Jason Rae – Secretary of the Democratic National Committee
 Mark Pryor (later a Senator, D-AR)
 Mead Treadwell – American businessman and politician who served as Lieutenant Governor of Alaska from 2010-2014. Chair of the U.S. Arctic Research Commission under president George W. Bush. He is considered one of the world's leading experts on the Arctic and Arctic development. 
 Gore Vidal – American writer and public intellectual known for his essays, novels, and Broadway plays
 Abigail Spanberger - member of the U.S. House of Representatives, D-VA

See also
 United States House of Representatives Page
 Canadian Senate Page Program
 Canadian House of Commons Page Program

References

External links
 Senator Reid speaks about the Senate Page Program
 History of the Senate Page School
 First Female Page Appointed
 Oral Interview with J. Franklin Little, Page 1910-1912

Page